Soglo may refer to:

Christophe Soglo (1909–1983), Beninese military officer and political leader
Ganiou Soglo (born 1961), Beninese politician of the Benin Rebirth Party (RB)
Léhady Soglo (born 1960), Beninese politician
Nicéphore Soglo (born 1934), Beninois politician, Prime Minister of Benin (1990–1991), President (1991–1996)
Rosine Vieyra Soglo, member of the Pan-African Parliament from Benin
Saturnin Soglo, Beninese politician
Sosthène Soglo (born 1986), Beninese football player

See also
Joglo
Koglo
Oglio
Soglio (disambiguation)